Rabbi Chaim Yehudah Leib Tiktinsky (also spelled Tikutinsky) was a prominent 19th century Eastern European rabbi. He served as rosh yeshiva of the Mir Yeshiva in Russia, the third of the Tiktinsky family to serve the position.

Early life 

Rabbi Tiktinsky was born on October 13, 1823, in the town of Mir in the Russian Empire (currently in Belarus). His father, Rabbi Shmuel Tiktinsky, had founded the Mir Yeshiva in his town several years prior, in 1817, and  after his death in 1835, his older son, Rabbi Avraham Tiktinsky, became the rosh yeshiva, the post he held until his death four years later. Chaim Leib was just 17 seventeen years old at the time of his brother's death, and too young to replace him as rosh yeshiva. Therefore, Rabbi Yosef David Eisenstadt, the town's rabbi, became the rosh yeshiva, and after his death in 1846, his son Rabbi Moshe Avraham Eisenstadt, succeeded him. Rabbi Chaim Leib Tiktinsky was installed as a co-rosh yeshiva.

Rabbinic career 

Many felt that Rabbi Tiktinsky, as the son of the yeshiva's founder, should lead as the sole rosh yeshiva. Twenty rabbis from Europe therefore gathered to listen to shiurim (classes) given by both Rabbis Tiktinsky and Eisenstadt, and decide afterwards which one was more suited to serve as rosh yeshiva. Rabbi Eisenstadt gave a complex shuir that left the rabbis impressed while Rabbi Tiktinsky's was fairly simple, as he focused on the basic explanation of the Gemara and the commentaries of Rashi and Tosafot. After the presentations, it was decided that Rabbi Tiktinsky's approach was better for the students, and he was appointed as rosh yeshiva. Rabbi Yisrael Salanter commented on this approach, saying that "anyone who wants to understand the daf (a folio of the Babylonian Talmud) properly should listen to Reb Chaim Leib teach it."

For fifty years, Rabbi Tiktinsky led the yeshiva. Under his leadership, it became one of the largest yeshivas in Europe, second only to the Volozhin Yeshiva. During the years he served as rosh yeshiva, the yeshiva experienced several unprecedented challenges, as their building was engulfed twice by fires; many manuscripts of chiddushei Torah (Torah novellae) were destroyed as well in the blaze. Another challenge the yeshiva faced was from the Haskalah movement which tried attracting yeshiva students.

Death 

Rabbi Tiktinsky died on March 30, 1899, at the age of 75, in Warsaw. He was succeeded as rosh yeshiva by his son, Rabbi Avraham Tiktinsky.

Notes and references 

1823 births
1899 deaths
Rosh yeshivas
Belarusian Haredi rabbis
Mir rosh yeshivas
People from Karelichy District
People from Mir, Belarus
19th-century rabbis from the Russian Empire